The Drongs are a group of sea stacks off the coast of Hillswick Ness, Northmavine, Shetland, Scotland. They lie to the west of the Isle of Westerhouse in St Magnus Bay. They have been described as "a focus of interest from all surrounding parts, including Eshaness", from which they are the most readily viewed, and as such are considered an icon of Eshaness, along with the famous Dore Holm.

Etymology 
The name the Drongs comes from the Old Norse drangr, which means "free standing pillar of rock". Drangr is synonymous with the Old Norse word stakkr, which subsequently became the word stack that is used in the names of many sea stacks in Shetland.

Formation 

The Drongs consist of tall vertical pillars of granite. There are four main stacks, which have been unofficially termed by climbers as the Main Drong, Slender Drong, Slim Drong and Stumpy Drong. The unusual shape of these sea stacks formed as the result of erosion of a larger landmass composed of both schists and gneiss: the schists eroded more rapidly than the granite gneiss, leaving only the granite pillars.

The appearance of the Drongs from some angles has been likened to a ship under sail, a group of castle towers, or a cowled monk. The rock formation has featured in artwork and has been used as the subject of postcards since at least 1903.

Climbing 
In May 1992, climbers Mick Fowler, Andy Nisbet, Jon Lincoln and Craig Jones climbed each of the four main stacks within seven days. Evidence was found that suggested the stacks had been climbed prior to their ascent. The climbs for all four stacks are graded between "Severe" and "Hard Very Severe".

References

Sources 

 }
 
 
 
 
 
 
 
 
 
 
 

 
 

Archipelagoes of Scotland
Uninhabited islands of Shetland
Northmavine